John Gladstone Nightingale (1899–1967) was an English professional footballer who made 185 Football League appearances playing as an outside right for Wolverhampton Wanderers and Brighton & Hove Albion, where he spent the majority of his career.

Life and career
Nightingale was born in 1899 in Oldbury, which was then in Worcestershire. He played non-league football for Brandhall Rovers and Kidderminster Harriers before joining Wolverhampton Wanderers in late 1919. He played three Second Division matches, but was released at the end of the season and joined Shrewsbury Town of the Birmingham & District League. Brighton & Hove Albion of the Third Division South paid £100 for his services in 1921, and he went on to make nearly 200 first-team appearances over six years, and was a regular at outside right for the last four of the six. He then rejoined Shrewsbury Town in 1927. Nightingale lived in Brighton in his later years, and died in the town in 1967 at the age of 68.

References

1899 births
1967 deaths
People from Oldbury, West Midlands
English footballers
Association football outside forwards
Kidderminster Harriers F.C. players
Wolverhampton Wanderers F.C. players
Shrewsbury Town F.C. players
Brighton & Hove Albion F.C. players
English Football League players